The 1973 Rice Owls football team was an American football team that represented Rice University in the Southwest Conference during the 1973 NCAA Division I football season. In their second year under head coach Al Conover, the team compiled a 5–6 record.

Schedule

Personnel

Season summary

at Texas

References

Rice
Rice Owls football seasons
Rice Owls football